Richard or Rick Berry may refer to:

Arts and entertainment
Richard Berry (musician) (1935–1997), African-American singer
Richard Berry (actor) (born 1950), French actor
Rick Berry (artist) (born 1952), American expressionistic figurative artist

Politics
Richard J. Berry (born 1962), American politician and former mayor of Albuquerque, New Mexico
Richard N. Berry (1915–2018), American politician from Maine
Richard Nixon Berry (1873–1956), Canadian dentist and politician

Others
Richard Berry (scientist), British-Canadian chemist
Richard Berry (missionary) (1824–1908), care worker in South Australia
Richard Berry, 3rd Viscount Kemsley (born 1951), British peer
Rick Berry (born 1978), Canadian ice hockey player
Ricky Berry (1964–1989), American basketball player
Richard James Arthur Berry (1867–1962), British surgeon and professor of anatomy in Australia

See also
Richard Barry (disambiguation)
Richard Berry Harrison (1864–1935), Canadian actor, teacher, dramatic reader and lecturer
Richard Berry Jr. House (disambiguation)